Deva Dynasty (c. 12th – 13th centuries) was a Bengali Hindu dynasty which originated in the Bengal region of the Indian subcontinent; the dynasty ruled over eastern Bengal after the Sena dynasty. The capital of the dynasty was Bikrampur in present-day Munshiganj District of Bangladesh.

This Hindu Vaishnava dynasty is different from an earlier Buddhist Dabnyawatti dynasty (c. 8th-9th centuries) of Samatata, whose capital was Danyawatti. Four rulers of this dynasty are known from the inscriptions: Shantideva, Viradeva, Anandadeva and Bhavadeva. The rule of the Devas was indeed a period of peace, prosperity, and creative excellence, and may be designated as the "Golden Age".

Rulers

The major sources of the history of this dynasty are the three copperplate inscriptions of Damodaradeva issued in years 1156, 1158 and 1165 of the Saka era, which were his 4th, 6th and 13th regnal years. Although there are many myths about this dynasty, none were proved with strong evidence. The first three rulers are known from the Chittagong copperplate inscription of Damodaradeva dated Saka era 1165. The first ruler of this dynasty was Purushottamadeva, who rose from the position of a village chief (gramani). His son Madhumathana or Madhusudanadeva was the first independent ruler of this dynasty, who assumed the title of nripati. He was succeeded by his son Vasudeva and Vasudeva was succeeded by his son Damodaradeva. Damodaradeva (reigned 1231–1243) was the most powerful ruler of this dynasty. He took the title of Ariraja-Chanura-Madhava-Sakala-Bhupati-Chakravarti. The inscriptional evidences show that his kingdom was extended up to the present-day Comilla-Noakhali-Chittagong region. A later ruler of this dynasty Ariraja-Danuja-Madhava Dasharathadeva extended his kingdom up to Bikrampur and made it his capital. Yahya bin Ahmad in his Tarikh-i-Mubarak Shahi mentioned that he (referred as Danuj Rai of Sonargaon by Yahya) made an alliance with Ghiyas-ud-Din Balban in 1281. His brother Bikramaditya Deva later moved to the eastern side of the kingdom in 1294. This is the last recorded history of this dynasty.

See also
 Pala Empire
 History of Bengal
 History of India

References

Dynasties of Bengal
Hindu dynasties
Historical Hindu empires
Medieval Bengal
Medieval India
States and territories established in the 11th century